The Battle of Buckland Mills, also known as The Buckland Races or Chestnut Hill, was fought on October 19, 1863, between Union and Confederate forces in the American Civil War. Union cavalry led by Brig. Gen. Judson Kilpatrick were caught in a Confederate ambush and defeated.

Near Buckland Mills, on Broad Run, Confederate cavalry commander Maj. Gen. J.E.B. Stuart, with Maj. Gen. Wade Hampton's cavalry division, were covering Gen. Robert E. Lee's retirement from his defeat at Bristoe to the Rappahannock River. On October 19, they turned on Kilpatrick's pursuing Federal cavalry, while Maj. Gen. Fitzhugh Lee's division charged the Federal flank. Kilpatrick was routed, fleeing five miles to Haymarket and Gainesville. The Confederates derisively called the affair "The Buckland Races", although some Confederate commanders likened it to a fox hunt. The Condeferate forces incurred 41 casualties. The Union forces lost about 261 men, most of which were taken prisoner.

Battlefield preservation

The Civil War Trust (a division of the American Battlefield Trust) and its partners have acquired and preserved  of the battlefield.

References

 Adams, James Truslow, Dictionary of American History, New York: Charles Scribner's Sons, 1940.
 National Park Service battle description
 CWSAC Report Update and Resurvey: Individual Battlefield Profiles

Bristoe campaign
Battles of the Eastern Theater of the American Civil War
Confederate victories of the American Civil War
Buckland Mills
Battle of Buckland Mills
Battle of Buckland Mills
Conflicts in 1863
1863 in Virginia
October 1863 events